Phil Cooney may refer to:
 Philip Cooney (born 1959), American lobbyist
 Phil Cooney (baseball) (1882–1957), baseball player